The Brownie Chasma is a chasma located on Ariel. They are named after brownies, which are spirits believed to help with household tasks.

References

Ariel (moon)
Surface features of Uranian moons